The Inter-Mountain is an afternoon daily newspaper serving Central West Virginia and is headquartered in Elkins.  As of 2006, its circulation was quoted at 11,000. The news is currently available on-line, as well as via the traditional broadsheet format, providing options for readers. 

The publication was known as The Daily Inter-Mountain in the early part of the twentieth century,  The paper was later called The Elkins Inter-Mountain for many years and now for several decades the newspaper has been titled The Inter-Mountain, reflecting the broad range of circulation to many cities, towns, and rural areas of West Virginia.

General Information

The Inter-Mountain has served the citizenry of central West Virginia for more than a century. In fact, for years The Inter-Mountain has been the only daily newspaper in Randolph and the 7 surrounding counties.

The newspaper's production center is located in a college town, home of Davis & Elkins College, and is near land transportation links and an airport.  A nationally recognized fall festival is held early in October known as the Mountain State Forest Festival.  The festival provides opportunity to celebrate the beauty of the forests and brings thousands of visitors to the city each year.  Dignitaries have descended upon Elkins for each of the many fall celebrations.

Historical Information
The Elkins-based newspaper of the Ogden Newspapers Inc. chain has an interesting history.  In 1897, a fire in the town did much damage to the early newspaper offices and other structures.  Again, on August 7, 1974, The Inter-Mountain burned to the ground and everything was destroyed but a camera, a roll of film, and the newspaper personnel who escaped with their lives literally running from the fire.  Stories of the fire and the response to the emergency were highlighted in news stories published around the country.

A story in The Miami Herald noted that Editor Eldora Marie Bolyard Nuzum vowed that not one edition would be missed as a result of the fire.  Other publications and the broadcast media carried the story of the newspaper that had not died in the fire and the famous radio commentator, Paul Harvey, praised the Editor, staff, and publisher for perseverance against the odds in one of his "now you know the rest of the story segments".  By borrowing typewriters, getting a press delivered into Elkins meant for another town, and printing the paper at another Ogden site in Parkersburg, the next scheduled edition of The Inter-Mountain was delivered carrying the story of the fire on the first page. Not one employee lost their job.

In The 100 Best Small Towns in America by Norman Crampton, printed in 1995, Eldora Nuzum was quoted, "We made headlines across the country" and she suggested "the show must go on."  Crampton wrote that "She asked townspeople who had darkrooms to go straight home and develop the film that many had shot of the big blaze downtown.  Mrs. Nuzum even had the presence of mind to remember regular events--she assigned a reporter to cover the school board meeting that evening."

Over the years, The Inter-Mountain Editor, Eldora Nuzum, interviewed U.S. Presidents and other dignitaries and is recognized as a respected and honored American newspaper editor and American journalist. She was the first female editor of a daily newspaper in West Virginia. Though women before her published small, sporadic social publications, Nuzum was a pioneer in being managing editor of a daily periodical publishing hard news in the state.

The Inter-Mountain developed from a linotype print publication to the modern, computerized publication it is today.

Owner Information

The Inter-Mountain is one of several newspapers printed by Ogden Newspapers Inc. in West Virginia and is among many papers published by the major chain in the United States.

Publishing Information

The Inter-Mountain recently named a new publisher, Heather Goodwin Henline, who has been with Ogden Newspapers Inc. for 13 years. She has won multiple state and national newspaper awards and recognitions during her tenure. The West Virginia native most recently was editor of The Journal in Martinsburg, W.Va., one of The Inter-Mountains sister publications.

Elkins native Steve Herron was named publisher of The Inter-Mountain on May 1, 2017.

References

External links
The Inter-Mountain

I
I
Elkins, West Virginia